Henry Wilkinson may refer to:

 Henry Wilkinson (1610–1675) (called "Long Harry"), English divinity professor and nonconformist
 Henry Wilkinson (1616–1690) (called "Dean Harry"), English philosophy professor and nonconformist
 Henry Clement Wilkinson (1837–1908), British Army officer
 Henry Spenser Wilkinson (1853–1937), professor of military history and writer
 H. B. Wilkinson (1870-1954), Arizona politician
 Henry Wilkinson (cricketer) (1877–1967), English first-class cricketer
 Henry Wilkinson (footballer, born 1883), English footballer
 Henry Wilkinson, early owner of Wilkinson Sword Company

See also
Harry Wilkinson (disambiguation)